is a railway station on the Tsugaru Railway Line in the city of Goshogawara, Aomori, Japan, operated by the private railway operator Tsugaru Railway Company.

Lines

Station layout
The station has a single side platform serving a bidirectional track. The station is unattended.

History
Bishamon Station was opened on July 15, 1931. It was closed on August 1, 1941, but was reopened on May 20, 1955.

Surrounding area
The station is located in an isolated rural area.

See also
 List of railway stations in Japan

External links

 

Railway stations in Aomori Prefecture
Tsugaru Railway Line
Goshogawara
Railway stations in Japan opened in 1931